Galopin (1872–1899) was a British Thoroughbred racehorse and sire. In a racing career which lasted from June 1874 until October 1875 he ran nine times and won eight races. He was one of the best British two-year-olds of 1874, winning his first three races before sustaining the only defeat of his career in the Middle Park Plate. In 1875, he won all five of his races including the Derby. At the end of the season he was retired to stud where he became an extremely successful and influential breeding stallion.

Background
Galopin was a bay stallion standing 15.3 hands high, bred in Lincolnshire by William Taylor Sharpe. His reported sire, Vedette, was a successful racehorse, winning the Great Yorkshire Stakes, the Doncaster Cup (twice), and the 1857 2,000 Guineas Stakes. Vedette's value as a stallion had declined to such an extent that he was sold at auction for 42 guineas when he was seventeen. Apart from Galopin, the best of Vedette's offspring was Speculum, who won the Goodwood Cup, the Suburban Handicap, was third in The Derby, and was Britain's Champion Sire in 1878. Vedette also sired some good hunters. Genetic evidence  indicates that Galopin's offspring do not share the Y chromosome haplotype of the sire line to which Vedette belongs. This substantiates earlier suggestions that another horse, Delight, belonging to the sire line with the Y chromosome haplotype corresponding to that inferred for Galopin, was the latter's true sire. Galopin's dam Flying Duchess (1853) was by the 1849 Epsom Derby winner The Flying Dutchman. 

As a foal, Galopin and his mother were sold for a combined price of 100 guineas by a representative of the Middle Park stud. A year later, the yearling was offered for sale again, and was bought for 520 guineas by the Hungarian aristocrat Gustavus Batthyany, acting on the advice of his private trainer John Dawson. Galopin was trained by Dawson at Batthyany's Warren House stable at Newmarket, Suffolk.

Racing career

1874: two-year-old season
On his first appearance on a racecourse, Galopin finished second in the Hyde Park Stakes at Epsom Downs Racecourse. After Galopin's jockey lodged an objection however, the winner was disqualified and the colt was credited with a winning debut. At Royal Ascot in June, Galopin ran twice, winning the New Stakes and the Fern Hill Stakes, both over five furlongs

After a break of almost four months, Galopin returned to the racecourse in October to contest the Middle Park Plate, the most valuable and prestigious race of the season for two-year-olds. He finished third to Plebeian, but appeared to be a very unlucky loser, having been badly hampered and almost falling a furlong from the finish. Dawson thought so highly of the colt that he intended to run him in a trial against the five-year-old Prince Charlie, the winner of the 2000 Guineas and the leading sprinter in England. Batthyany, however, refused to allow the match as he felt that the test would be too severe for his colt.

1875: three-year-old season
Galopin began his three-year-old career by running a match race against a filly named Stray Shot over Newmarket's Rowley Mile course. He won by ten lengths to claim the £500 stake money. At Epsom, Galopin started the 2/1 favourite for the Derby against seventeen opponents. Ridden by John Morris, he won comfortably by a length from Claremont. The race was rather closer than it might have been as Morris eased the colt down in the closing stages. After his win in the Derby, Galopin's owners took the unusual step of returning the horse to sprint distances. At Royal Ascot he won his second Fern Hill Stakes, beating the filly Bella.

Galopin had never been entered for the St Leger Stakes and did not appear again until October. At Newmarket he won a £1,000 match race against the five-year-old Lowlander, the winner of the Royal Hunt Cup and the All-Aged Stakes. His final race came two days later in the Newmarket Derby in which he defeated the St Leger winner Craig Millar.

Batthyany had a heart condition that enforced early retirement of Galopin as it was feared that the excitement of watching his horse race may risk the Prince's life.

Stud record
After the death of the Prince in 1883, Galopin was sold to Henry Chaplin for 8,000 guineas, but was not initially well received as a stallion because of the presence of Blacklock in his pedigree. He later stood at Blankney Hall, Sleaford, Lincolnshire. 

Galopin was the leading sire in Great Britain and Ireland in 1888, 1889 and 1898 and topped the broodmare sire list four times. He was the damsire of Bayardo and of the 1886 U.K. Triple Crown Champion, Flying Fox.

Assessment and honours
In May 1886 The Sporting Times carried out a poll of one hundred racing experts to create a ranking of the best British racehorses of the 19th century.  Galopin was ranked nineteenth, having been placed in the top ten by 14 of the contributors. He was the third highest ranked horse of the 1870s, behind Isonomy and Cremorne.

From 1925, the London & North Eastern Railway had a tradition of naming locomotives after prominent racehorses, and their Class A1 locomotive no. 2575 (later British Railways no. 60076), which had been built in October 1924, was named Galopin after this horse, and remained in service until October 1962.

Pedigree

See also
List of leading Thoroughbred racehorses

References

1872 racehorse births
1899 racehorse deaths
Epsom Derby winners
Racehorses bred in the United Kingdom
Racehorses trained in the United Kingdom
Thoroughbred family 3-i